Wulian County is a county of the prefecture-level city of Rizhao, Shandong. The county is known for and named after its eponymous Wulian Mountain. It borders Zhucheng to the north, Donggang District to the south, Ju County to the west and Xihai'an to the east.

Wulian is the birthplace of noted poet Wang Fugang.

Geography

Administrative divisions

Wulian County administers one subdistrict, nine towns and two townships:

In 2002, Wulian County administered nine towns and three townships:
Towns: Hongning, Jietou, Yuli, Xumeng , Chaohe, Wanghu, Kouguan, Zhongzhi, Gaoze.
Townships: Shichang, Hubu, Songbai.

Climate

References

External links

Counties of Shandong
Rizhao